Sonic Text is an album by American jazz saxophonist Joe Farrell recorded in 1979 and released on the Contemporary label.

Reception
The Allmusic review called it "an excellent straight-ahead outing" stating "The concise solos make expert use of every note, and the results are both fresh and swinging".

Track listing
All compositions by Joe Farrell except as indicated
 "Sonic Text" - 6:27
 "When You're Awake" - 7:11
 "The Jazz Crunch" (Freddie Hubbard) - 8:16
 "If I Knew Where You're At" - 6:56
 "Sweet Rita Suite (Part 1): Her Spirit" (George Cables) - 4:25
 "Malibu" - 11:48

Personnel
Joe Farrell - tenor saxophone, soprano saxophone, flute
Freddie Hubbard - trumpet, flugelhorn
George Cables - piano, electric piano
Tony Dumas - bass, electric bass
Peter Erskine - drums

References

Contemporary Records albums
Joe Farrell albums
1980 albums